Tre må man være is a 1959 Danish family film directed by Sven Methling and starring Poul Reichhardt.

Cast
 Poul Reichhardt - Peter Halling
 Helle Virkner - Elisabeth Halling
 Ghita Nørby - Kate Halling
 Preben Mahrt - Arkæolog Johannes Brodersen
 Ellen Gottschalch - Frk. Willumsen
 Ole Wisborg - Læge Erik Brinck
 Lily Weiding - Speaker

External links

1959 films
1950s Danish-language films
Danish black-and-white films
Films directed by Sven Methling